Danielle Marie Larivee  (born May 11, 1974) is a Canadian politician who was elected in the 2015 Alberta general election to the Legislative Assembly of Alberta representing the electoral district of Lesser Slave Lake. She defeated incumbent Progressive Conservative MLA Pearl Calahasen, who had served the district since 1989 and was the longest serving incumbent. She is a public health nurse. In 2019 Larivee ran as a candidate in the Alberta election for Lesser Slave Lake and lost to Pat Rehn who belonged to the United Conservative Party (UCP).

Larivee was named to the cabinet as Minister of Municipal Affairs and the Minister in Charge of Service Alberta on October 22, 2015. On January 19, 2017, Larivee was named Minister of the new Ministry of Child Services, a portfolio previously held by Irfan Sabir. Sabir was retained as the Minister for Community and Social Services. Shaye Anderson was named as the new Minister of Municipal Affairs, filling the vacancy created by Larivee's new appointment. On June 18, 2018, Alberta premier at the time Rachel Notley introduced Larivee role as the Children's Services Minister as well as the minister for the status of women 

Larivee subsequently lost her bid at re-election in 2019 to UCP candidate Pat Rehn. Following this, she was elected as the First Vice-President of the United Nurses of Alberta in the fall of 2019.

Electoral history

2019 general election

2015 general election

References

Alberta New Democratic Party MLAs
Living people
1974 births
Women MLAs in Alberta
21st-century Canadian politicians
21st-century Canadian women politicians
Women government ministers of Canada
Members of the Executive Council of Alberta
Canadian nurses
Canadian women nurses